Melyncourt Halt railway station co-served the village of Resolven, in the historical county of Glamorganshire, Wales, from 1905 to 1964 on the Vale of Neath Railway.

History 
The station was opened on 1 June 1905 by the Great Western Railway. It closed on 15 June 1964.

References 

Disused railway stations in Neath Port Talbot
Beeching closures in Wales
Railway stations in Great Britain opened in 1905
Railway stations in Great Britain closed in 1964
1905 establishments in Wales
1964 disestablishments in Wales